Bowersock is a surname. Notable people with the surname include:

Glen Bowersock (born 1936), American historian
J. P. Bowersock, American record producer
Jane Dee Hull (née Bowersock) (born 1935), American politician
Justin De Witt Bowersock (1842–1922), American politician